Katrina Cecchini (born 17 June 1988) is an Australian Paralympic swimmer.  She was born in Canberra with mild cerebral palsy due to being born ten weeks premature. She started swimming at the suggestion of a neighbour. She attended St Mary MacKillop College, Canberra, graduating in 2006.

Her philosophy is "You may be classed as disabled but never take the 'dis' out of disabled, take the 'able' and you will get where you want to be."

Career

At the 2002 IPC Swimming World Championships in Mar Del Plata, Argentina, she won a silver and bronze medal. She competed in five events and won a bronze medal at the 2004 Athens Games in the Women's 4 × 100 m Freestyle 34 pts event. She won a bronze medal at the 2008 Beijing Games in the Women's 50 m Freestyle S10 event.
She had an Australian Institute of Sport paralympic swimming scholarship.

At the 2006 Commonwealth Games in Melbourne, she finished fifth in both the Women's 50 m Freestyle and 100 m Freestyle events.

Recognition
 Dawn Fraser Junior Female Award for 2001 and 2004
 2001 Margaret Whitfield Award
 Clubs ACT Sport Star Award for 2002, 2003 and 2005

References

Female Paralympic swimmers of Australia
Swimmers at the 2004 Summer Paralympics
Swimmers at the 2006 Commonwealth Games
Swimmers at the 2008 Summer Paralympics
Paralympic bronze medalists for Australia
1988 births
Living people
Australian Institute of Sport Paralympic swimmers
Sportswomen from the Australian Capital Territory
Medalists at the 2004 Summer Paralympics
Medalists at the 2008 Summer Paralympics
S10-classified Paralympic swimmers
ACT Academy of Sport alumni
Paralympic medalists in swimming
Commonwealth Games competitors for Australia
Australian female freestyle swimmers
21st-century Australian women